Pseudocaecilius is a genus of false lizard barklice in the family Pseudocaeciliidae. There are more than 50 described species in Pseudocaecilius.

Species
These 53 species belong to the genus Pseudocaecilius:

 Pseudocaecilius africanus Badonnel, 1931
 Pseudocaecilius angustus (Enderlein, 1903)
 Pseudocaecilius bibulbus Li, 1993
 Pseudocaecilius bicostatus Li, 2002
 Pseudocaecilius brevicornis Enderlein, 1931
 Pseudocaecilius ceratocercus Li, 2002
 Pseudocaecilius citricola (Ashmead, 1879)
 Pseudocaecilius claggi (Banks, 1937)
 Pseudocaecilius clunialis Vaughan, Thornton & New, 1991
 Pseudocaecilius cornutus Lee & Thornton, 1967
 Pseudocaecilius cribrarius (Hagen, 1859)
 Pseudocaecilius danaus Lee & New, 1992
 Pseudocaecilius euryocercus Li, 2002
 Pseudocaecilius fletcheri Datta, 1965
 Pseudocaecilius formosanus (Banks, 1937)
 Pseudocaecilius funestus (Enderlein, 1903)
 Pseudocaecilius galactozonalis Li, 2002
 Pseudocaecilius helicoides Lee & Thornton, 1967
 Pseudocaecilius hispidus Enderlein, 1913
 Pseudocaecilius immaculatus Li, 2002
 Pseudocaecilius inaequalis (Banks, 1916)
 Pseudocaecilius innotatus Banks, 1937
 Pseudocaecilius kagoshimensis (Okamoto, 1910)
 Pseudocaecilius katmanduensis New, 1971
 Pseudocaecilius lanatus (Hagen, 1859)
 Pseudocaecilius largicellus Li, 2002
 Pseudocaecilius machadoi Badonnel, 1955
 Pseudocaecilius maculosus Enderlein, 1907
 Pseudocaecilius marshalli Karny, 1926
 Pseudocaecilius molestus (Hagen, 1859)
 Pseudocaecilius monotaeniatus Li, 2002
 Pseudocaecilius morstatti Enderlein, 1913
 Pseudocaecilius nitoris (Banks, 1937)
 Pseudocaecilius octomaculatus Li, 2002
 Pseudocaecilius otiosus (Banks, 1937)
 Pseudocaecilius papillaris Li, 2002
 Pseudocaecilius paraornatus New, 1977
 Pseudocaecilius plagiozonalis Li, 1995
 Pseudocaecilius productus New & Thornton, 1976
 Pseudocaecilius pusillus (Banks, 1931)
 Pseudocaecilius ranus Thornton, 1984
 Pseudocaecilius serratus Lee & New, 1992
 Pseudocaecilius setifer Vaughan, Thornton & New, 1991
 Pseudocaecilius sexdentatus Li, 2002
 Pseudocaecilius tahitiensis (Karny, 1926)
 Pseudocaecilius tenellus Enderlein, 1926
 Pseudocaecilius testaceus Enderlein, 1903
 Pseudocaecilius undecimimaculatus Li, 1995
 Pseudocaecilius utricularis Li, 1999
 Pseudocaecilius venimaculatus Li, 2002
 Pseudocaecilius villosus (Enderlein, 1903)
 Pseudocaecilius wellsae Lee & New, 1992
 Pseudocaecilius zonatus (Hagen, 1859)

References

External links

 

Pseudocaeciliidae
Articles created by Qbugbot